Dr. Khaled S. Al-Sultan (born 1 January 1963 in Al Qasim, Saudi Arabia) was the fourth  rector of King Fahd University for Petroleum and Minerals (KFUPM) a public university in Dhahran, Saudi Arabia and the first to have graduated from the institution to hold this position.  Dr. Al-Sultan is married and has two children.

Education
 Ph.D. in Industrial and Operations Engineering (Operation Research), The University of Michigan, Ann Arbor, U.S.A., 1990.
 M.S. in Mathematics (Applied Mathematics), The University of Michigan, Ann Arbor, U.S.A., 1990. 
 M.S. in Systems Engineering, King Fahd University of Petroleum and Minerals (KFUPM), Dhahran, Saudi Arabia, January 1987. 
 B.S. (with Highest Honor) in Systems Engineering, KFUPM, January 1985

External links
 https://web.archive.org/web/20090703042206/http://www.kfupm.edu.sa/kfupm/administration/rector.aspx

1963 births
Living people
University of Michigan College of Engineering alumni
Academic staff of King Fahd University of Petroleum and Minerals
King Fahd University of Petroleum and Minerals alumni
Heads of universities and colleges in Saudi Arabia